Alexandre Vincent Jandel (born at Gerbéviller, Lorraine, 18 July 1810; died at Rome, 11 December 1872) was a French Dominican, who became Master of the Order of Preachers.

After a college course at Nancy, he entered the diocesan seminary there. He was ordained priest on 20 September 1834, then appointed professor of Scripture, and soon afterwards rector of the seminary at Pont-à-Mousson. At this time he became acquainted with Bautain, Gerbet, Maria Alphonse Ratisbonne, and many other distinguished men, among them Jean-Baptiste Henri Lacordaire. Such was the impression made on him by Lacordaire, that he began to think of entering the Dominican Order. The great preacher proposed to restore it in France, where it had been destroyed by the French Revolution.

In 1839 he therefore went to Rome, consulted Pope Gregory XVI on the matter, and finally received the habit on 15 May 1841. Two years afterwards Jandel and Lacordaire commenced the work of re-establishing their order in France. Lacordaire was an orator; Jandel was a ruler of men: calm, grave, sagacious, tenacious of traditions and customs, and pre-eminently practical. Though he had not the genius of his associate, he preached with great results. It is told how a sermon at Lyon on the power of the Cross led to his being challenged by a Freemason to prove the truth of his words in the lodge; he entered it, produced his crucifix, and made the sign of the cross; instantly the lights were extinguished, the furniture was thrown about, and all but he fled in terror from the scene of confusion.

Many persons in France placed themselves under his guidance. Pope Pius IX, however, called him to Rome, and made him in 1850 vicar-general of the order ad beneplacitum, and in 1855 general for six years. He was soon recognized as a great religious superior and one of the most enlightened spiritual directors in the city. Of those whom he instructed at this time, two may be mentioned: Cardinal Manning and Father Burke.

A born administrator, he infused new life into the order. Several provinces were re-established, and houses opened everywhere. The Dominican nuns (second order) and tertiaries were also indebted to his zeal. He also did much to promote devotion to the rosary and to propagate the doctrine of Thomas Aquinas. Such were the services he rendered to the Holy See especially as regarded the Zouaves, that Pius IX, who was warmly attached to him, intended to make him a cardinal; but he was elected general of the order, on 7 June 1862.

He visited Ireland twice, and only weak health prevented him from visiting America. New editions of liturgical books and of the "constitutions" or legislation formed part of his characteristic work. He also paid great attention to foreign missions. During his term of office sixteen Dominicans were beatified or canonized. He presided at two chapters of the order, and he is considered as one of its greatest generals.

References
Cormier, Vie du Révérendissime Père Jandel, soixante-troisième Maître Général des Frères Prêcheurs (Paris, 1890)

External links
 
Source

1810 births
1872 deaths
French Dominicans
Masters of the Order of Preachers